Fascicularia is a genus of flowering plants in the pineapple family Bromeliaceae, subfamily Bromelioideae. The genus name is from the Latin fasciculus (bundle) and arius (pertaining to).

Only one species is known, Fascicularia bicolor. It is indigenous to Chile and reportedly naturalized in France and the extreme south and west of Great Britain. In the wild, all Fascicularias are saxicolous (growing on rocks) or epiphytes.

It is cultivated in gardens for the dramatic bright crimson colour of its leaves contrasting with the blue inflorescence.<ref name=RHS>{{cite web|title=Fascicularia bicolor, Crimson bromeliad |url=https://www.rhs.org.uk/Plants/7145/Fascicularia-bicolor/Details |publisher=Royal Horticultural Society |access-date=18 August 2020}}</ref>

The edible fruits are similar to those of the species Greigia sphacelata, but smaller; They are consumed in the same way as these.

Subspecies
Two subspecies are recognized:
 Fascicularia bicolor subsp. bicolor Fascicularia bicolor subsp. canaliculata E.C.Nelson & Zizka

See AlsoOchagavia litoralisGreigia sphacelata''

References

External links
 BSI Genera Gallery photos
 http://fcbs.org/pictures/Fascicularia.htm

Bromelioideae
Monotypic Poales genera
Endemic flora of Chile
Bromeliaceae genera

de:Fascicularia bicolor